= San Diego County Bicycle Coalition =

The San Diego County Bicycle Coalition is a California 501(c)(3) nonprofit organization "dedicated to making bicycling better in San Diego." It aims to do this through educational programs, promoting awareness of bicyclists and bicycling issues, reviewing infrastructure improvements, and acting as a voice for bicyclists to elected officials and decision-makers throughout the San Diego region.

The coalition represents all of San Diego County instead of only a single city since there are many medium-sized cities in the county that are currently too small to support their own bicycle advocacy groups. The San Diego County Bicycle Coalition has a dues-paying membership of about 1,000 people, and a full-time Executive Director, Kathy Keehan.
